Suam Market (lit. Suam Downtown Market) is a traditional street market in Nam-gu, Ulsan, South Korea. Established in the early 1970s, today the market has more than 120 shops that sell fruits, vegetables, meat, fish, breads, clothing, and Korean traditional medicinal items. The market is also home to many small restaurants and street food stalls. The market is only about 100 meters from a large Homeplus supermarket, and therefore the market's prices must be competitive in order to keep steady business.

See also
 List of markets in South Korea
 List of South Korean tourist attractions

References

External links
Official website for Suam Market 

Nam District, Ulsan
Retail markets in Ulsan
Food markets in South Korea